The Two Brides is a lost 1919 silent film drama produced by Famous Players-Lasky and distributed through Paramount Pictures. It was directed by Edward José and starred Opera singer Lina Cavalieri in her last motion picture. An original story for the screen was written by Alicia Ramsey.

Cast
Lina Cavalieri - Diana di Marchesi
Courtenay Foote - Prince Marko
Warburton Gamble - Count Gabrielle de Marchesi
Hal Reid - Donata di Marchesi
Mrs. Turner - Marchesi's Housekeeper
Miss Richards - Young Wife
James Sheridan - Boy (*billed as Sherry Tansey)
Robert Milasch - Fisherman (*billed as R.E. Milash)
Emil Roe - Doctor

References

External links
The Two Brides at IMDb.com
allmovie/synopsis
lantern slide (Wayback Machine)

1919 films
American silent feature films
Lost American films
Films directed by Edward José
Silent American drama films
1919 drama films
Paramount Pictures films
American black-and-white films
1919 lost films
Lost drama films
1910s American films